West Norfolk Academies Trust is a multi-academy trust, serving schools in or close to King's Lynn, Norfolk.

Primary academies
Clenchwarton Primary
West Lynn Primary 
Snettisham Primary 
Heacham Junior
Heacham Infants 
Walpole Cross Keys Primary
Gaywood Primary

Secondary academies
St Clement's High School, Terrington St Clement
Smithdon High School, Hunstanton
Marshland High School, West Walton
Springwood High School, Gaywood

References

Multi-academy trusts